Abdullah Hammoud (born March 19, 1990) is an American politician who is the mayor of Dearborn, Michigan, a position to which he was elected on November 2, 2021. Hammoud had previously served in the Michigan House of Representatives, representing 15th district since 2017.

Hammoud is the first Arab-American and first Muslim mayor of Dearborn as well as the second youngest mayor in the city’s history. His election is considered historic as the city is home to one of the largest Middle Eastern and Muslim populations per capita in the United States.

Early life and education
Hammoud was born in Dearborn, Michigan, to immigrants from Lebanon. His dad worked as a truck driver and his mom, who had not completed high school, pursued education then became a small business owner. He earned a Bachelor of Science in biology from the University of Michigan–Dearborn, a Master of Public Health in epidemiology and genetics from the University of Michigan-Ann Arbor, and a Master's of Business Administration from the University of Michigan-Ross.

Michigan House of Representatives
At 26, then a healthcare advisor at the Henry Ford Health System, Hammoud decided to run for office after his older brother unexpectedly died. Hammoud defeated Republican nominee Terrance Guido Gerin, a WWE professional wrestler, in the general election by a margin of 61-38%.
Upon his election, Hammoud became the first Arab American and Muslim to represent the 15th district.

Tenure
Hammoud backed Senator Bernie Sanders in the 2020 Democratic Party presidential primaries.

When President Joe Biden visited a Ford factory in Dearborn during the 2021 Israel–Palestine crisis, Hammoud gave him a letter calling for a ceasefire and a re-evaluation of the Israel–United States relationship.

Mayor of Dearborn

2021 campaign
On January 25, 2021, Hammoud announced he would run for Mayor of Dearborn. Election night results on the August 3rd primary showed him in first with 50% followed by Susan Dabaja with 15.6% and Tom Tafelski with 13.5%. Hammoud finished first and he advanced to a November 2 general election against Gary Woronchak. In the November election, Hammoud won the race for mayor, making him the first Arab American and first Muslim mayor of Dearborn. His term began January 1, 2022.

Personal life
He is married to Fatima Beydoun, a doctor. They have a daughter, Maryam. He is a Shia Muslim.

References

1990 births
Living people
American people of Lebanese descent
American Muslims
Democratic Party members of the Michigan House of Representatives
21st-century American politicians
Politicians from Dearborn, Michigan
University of Michigan School of Public Health alumni
Ross School of Business alumni